Whichford House is a grade II* listed house in the village of Whichford, Warwickshire, England.

Whichford House was built in the 17th century as St Michael's Rectory, and in the 18th century it was enhanced with an open stairwell, a stone chimneypiece, and wood panelling in the principal rooms.

In the 1950s, it ceased to be used as the Rectory, and the Church of England sold it to the publisher George Rainbird, for £1,400. In the 1980s, it was sold to Major and High Sheriff of Warwickshire (1996) John Waddington Oakes and his wife, who lived there with their family, including sons Nigel Oakes and Alexander Waddington Oakes, and added a tennis court, swimming pool and a coach house at the entrance gate. The property includes five acres of gardens.

Since 2004, it has been owned by interior designer Simon Herrtage and his wife Bridget Barker.

References

External links

17th-century architecture in England
Grade II* listed houses
Grade II* listed buildings in Warwickshire
Clergy houses